The following is a list of keynote speakers at the commencement of Fordham University.

Commencement Speakers 1941–present

References 

Fordham University
Graduation